Sarbast is a village in Zirrah Rural District, Sadabad District, Dashtestan County, Bushehr Province, Iran. At the 2006 census, its population was 675, in 132 families.

The major crops are dates, wheat and barley.  The area has hot summers, sometimes with high humidity, and mild and pleasant winters.

References

External links

Aerial photograph of Sarbast
Aerial photograph of Sarbast

Populated places in Dashtestan County